Clem Smith may refer to:
 Clem Smith (footballer) (born 1996), Australian rules footballer
 Clem Smith (politician), member of the Missouri House of Representatives

See also  
 Clement Smith (disambiguation)